A goblin king is a king of goblins, such as found in European folklore

Goblin king or variation, may also refer to:

Characters
 The Goblin King (King of the Tengu), a Japanese mythological character that is supposed to live on Mount Kurama
 King of the Goblins, a German mythical character who is supposed to live in Hesselberg
 Goblin king, a character class from Dungeons and Dragons, a leadership variant of the goblin (Dungeons & Dragons)
 Goblin King, a character from Marvel Comics, a supervillain alter-ego taken up by multiple characters
 King of the Goblins, a character from the picturebook Hershel and the Hanukkah Goblins
 Goblin King, a character from the light novel series Grimgar of Fantasy and Ash
 Goblin King, a character from the 1986 film Labyrinth (1986 film) and its sequels
 Goblin King, a character from the 2008 film Scooby-Doo! and the Goblin King
 Goblin King, a character from the 2012 film The Hobbit: An Unexpected Journey that was nominated for several special effects awards
 Goblin King, a character from the 2018 film Legend of the Three Caballeros
 King of Goblins, a character from the 1995 videogame Stonekeep
 Goblin King, a game character from the boardgame Middle-earth Strategy Battle Game
 Goblin King, a toy character from the playset "Lego The Lord of the Rings"

Other uses
 Sergey Aksyonov (born 1972), a Russian politician nicknamed "Goblin" and "Goblin King"
 The Goblin King (book), a graphic novel published by Graphic Universe
 "Goblin King" (song), a 2016 song from the film The Huntsman: Winter's War
 King Goblin, a beer from Wychwood Brewery

See also

 Goblin (disambiguation)
 King (disambiguation)